Elisabeth Röhm (born April 28, 1973) is a German-American television and film actress. She is best known for playing Kate Lockley in the television series Angel from 1999 to 2001 and Serena Southerlyn in the television series Law & Order from 2001 to 2005.

She has also appeared in films such as Miss Congeniality 2: Armed and Fabulous (2005), American Hustle (2013), Joy (2015), Once Upon a Time in Venice (2017), The Tribes of Palos Verdes (2017) and Bombshell (2019).

Early life
Röhm was born in Düsseldorf, West Germany, to Lisa Loverde and Eberhard Röhm. Her father was a German partner at the law firm of Duane Morris LLP New York, and the family moved to New York City before her first birthday. Her mother was an American scriptwriter who once wrote for the TV soap opera Guiding Light. Röhm's parents divorced when she was 8 or 9. Her maternal grandfather was an Italian immigrant.

Röhm attended grades 11–12 at St. Andrew's-Sewanee School, a small private boarding school in Sewanee, Tennessee, and then graduated from Sarah Lawrence College, where she studied writing and European History.

Career

Röhm received her first TV acting role in 1997, as Dorothy Hayes in the American soap opera One Life to Live. She had a starring role in the 1999 BBC Northern Ireland miniseries Eureka Street, and she then portrayed recurring character Detective Kate Lockley in the first two seasons (1999–2001) of the TV series Angel. While appearing in Angel, Röhm also had a regular role in the only season (2000–2001) of the Turner Network Television drama series Bull.

Röhm portrayed regular character Assistant District Attorney Serena Southerlyn through four seasons (2001–2005) of the television series Law & Order. She also portrayed deputy DA Amanda Taylor on Stalker. More recently, Röhm has received critical acclaim for her roles in two David O. Russell films, American Hustle (2013) and Joy (2015).

Between 2016 and 2017, Röhm appeared in a Season-14 episode of NCIS, Netflix's Flaked, the film Once Upon a Time in Venice including Bruce Willis, Jason Momoa, John Goodman and Famke Janssen and the film The Tribes of Palos Verdes starring Jennifer Garner and Alicia Silverstone. She portrayed Martha MacCallum in the 2019 film Bombshell with Nicole Kidman, Charlize Theron and Margot Robbie.

Personal life
Röhm was a longtime avid equestrienne, but she gave up professional equestrianism after a 2005 accident that she spoke about in a 2011 episode of the Biography Channel series Celebrity Close Calls. She appeared in a horse-riding scene with Mark Harmon in an NCIS episode.

Röhm was engaged to director Austin Smithard in 2000. In 2005, Röhm began a relationship with Ron Anthony Wooster. Röhm and Wooster have a daughter born in 2008. Röhm and Wooster married in October 2008. They divorced in October 2014. In January 2019, Röhm announced her engagement to Judge Jonathan T. Colby. In March 2020, Röhm's publicist revealed that she and Colby are no longer together.

In October 2021, Röhm married Peter Glatzer with her daughter in attendance.

Röhm had a blog on her personal website, where she often wrote about life with her daughter and her then-fiancé. On January 6, 2011, People added Röhm's blog to the "Moms & Babies" section of its website.

Awards and nominations
Röhm, as part of the cast of the TV series Law & Order, was nominated for their 2001 performance, and again for their 2003 performance, for the Screen Actors Guild Award for Outstanding Performance by an Ensemble in a Drama Series. In 2014, Röhm and the rest of the cast won the Screen Actors Guild Award for Outstanding Performance by a Cast in a Motion Picture for their roles in American Hustle.

Röhm was selected for Maxim magazine's "Hot 100" list in 2002.

Filmography

References

External links

1973 births
American film actresses
American soap opera actresses
American television actresses
Living people
Sarah Lawrence College alumni
Actresses from New York City
20th-century American actresses
21st-century American actresses
German people of Italian descent
Outstanding Performance by a Cast in a Motion Picture Screen Actors Guild Award winners
Actors from Düsseldorf
American people of Italian descent
Citizens of the United States through descent
German emigrants to the United States